Mount St Benedict College is an independent Roman Catholic single-sex secondary day school for girls, located in Pennant Hills, a suburb on the Upper North Shore of Sydney, New South Wales, Australia. The college provides a religious and comprehensive education in the Good Samaritan tradition to approximately 1,000 girls from Year 7 to Year 12.

Mount St Benedict College commenced on 1 February 1966 with 65 students under the guidance of Sisters Christopher Burrows and Hyacinth Roche. The college is now an incorporated body which operates as an independent Catholic Congregational school with a board of directors. In 2008 there were approximately 835 girls from Year 7 to Year 12. Mount St Benedict is affiliated with the Alliance of Girls' Schools Australasia (AGSA) and the Association of Heads of Independent Girls' Schools (AHIGS).

History
Established by the Sisters of the Good Samaritan of the Order of St Benedict in 1966, the college is located in the Roman Catholic Diocese of Broken Bay and run under the auspices of the Sisters through its board of directors and the school Principal.

The Catholic view of life and the mission of Christ underpins and influences all the policies and practices of the school community. The students receive formal religious education and are also encouraged to participate in a wide range of activities which seek to broaden their understanding of, and commitment to, the faith life of the Church and its service to the broader community.

In 1987, in line with other Good Samaritan Schools, Mount St Benedict College was incorporated as a Company with a board of directors. The first lay Principal was appointed in 1994. The current principal is Michael Hanratty.

Curriculum
The Mount St Benedict Laptop Program began in 2010, providing girls in Years 9 and 11 with their own laptop. This was extended to Years 9–12 in 2011 and further extended to the whole school in 2012.

Activities

Co-curricular activities
 Future Problem Solving
 Da Vinci Decathlon
 Tournament of Minds
 Debating & Public Speaking
 Mock Trial
 Dance Ensemble
 College Choir
 Chamber Ensemble
 Concert Band

Sports
Mount St Benedict College offers students the opportunity to participate in sport at a representative level as well as in co-curricular teams. In addition all students in Years 7-10 participate in a fortnightly Physical Activity program. Sport at Mount St Benedict is something that is taken very seriously and this shows in the results of all events girls participate in.

Community
Mount St Benedict College has many community avenues. Besides the Parents' and Friends', the Ex-students' Association and the partners with the Good Samaritan causes (Mater Dei School in Narellan, Kiribati, Bacalod Kinder School in the Philippines, and Railaco High School in East Timor), students are involved in many community activities:
 Caritas Australia through work with Project Compassion during Lent
 Vinnes CEO Winter Sleepout
 Social Justice 
 Reconciliation Week
 Refugee and Asylum Seekers Week
 Make a Difference - group of students who discuss current issues, raise awareness and take action

Students at Mount St Benedict College have established a partnership with a high school in East Timor as a way to learn about social justice in a meaningful way. Four students and two teachers took stationery, musical instruments and school supplies to help establish a high school in East Timor. This support has continued for three years.

House system

Mount St Benedict College has eight houses, each named after Benedictine monasteries:

Notable alumnae

 Jordana Beatty, actress
 Joanne Carter, ice-skating
 Catherine Cox, netball
 Laura Dundovic, model and former Miss Universe Australia
 Jackie Fairweather (née Gallagher), triathlon and long-distance running
 Jaclyn Moriarty, author
 Christina Parie, X Factor 2011 top six contestant
 Jana Pittman, athlete
 Larissa Takchi, Masterchef winner

See also 

 List of Catholic schools in New South Wales
 Catholic education in Australia

References

External links
 Mount St Benedict College website
 Association of Independent Schools, NSW (AISNSW)

Girls' schools in New South Wales
Catholic secondary schools in Sydney
Hornsby Shire
Educational institutions established in 1966
1966 establishments in Australia
Alliance of Girls' Schools Australasia